Oleksandr Yuriyovych Kobets (born 27 September 1959) is a Ukrainian and Russian politician, businessman and former intelligence officer who served as the Russian-installed mayor of Kherson from 26 April 2022 until 11 November 2022 when Russian forces occupied the city.

Biography 
Kobets was born on 27 September 1959 in Kherson, in what was then the Ukrainian Soviet Socialist Republic of the Soviet Union.

KGB career 
Kobets served as a KGB officer until 1991, when he started working for the Security Service of Ukraine (SBU). Kobets supervised economic issues in the 1990s, in particular, the work of the Kherson Oil Refinery. In the early 2000s, Kobets was transferred to the head office of the SBU and served as an officer in the operational leadership of the SBU. A pensioner by seniority, he retired from the SBU in 2010.

In his resume, which was compiled in September 2020, he writes that "during his work in the special services, he cooperated with structural units of the Cabinet of Ministers, Ministry of Finance, Ministry of Economy, National Bank, State Property Fund, Antimonopoly Committee, Ministry of Energy and Coal Industry, Naftogaz, Ministry of Industrial Policy, Ministry of Agrarian Policy and Food, Ministry of Health. He carried out measures on financial, energy, food and environmental security of the state". Oleksandr Kobets wanted to get a position in one of the companies in Kyiv, but was not hired.

Activities in retirement 
Following his retirement, Kobets, together with his wife, founded a company which handles contract mediation for goods, production of juices, mineral water, soft drinks and trade. The Centre for Journalistic Investigations revealed that Kobets has not repaid a loan of 80 thousand dollars for several years.

In the summer of 2006, Oleksandr Kobets registered with Ukragrohimpromholding OJSC, which traded in ammonia and was founded by Oleksandr Bessonov, a former agent of the KGB, a citizen of the Russian Federation with a passport.

In 2007, he got a job at the "Ukrainian Collection Agency" company, dealing with personnel issues and official investigations.

Kobets then worked at RSB Petroleum FZC in the United Arab Emirates from 2008 to 2011. This company was engaged in trading in petroleum products and oil.

In 2012, he was the director of Transocean Ukraine Export LLC, which traded machines and equipment. In the same year, Oleksandr Kobets got a job as an adviser to the head of the Shevchenkiv district administration of Kyiv.

From 2015 to 2018, he worked at Alfa-Bank, where he managed internal security.

From 2018 to 2020, he held the position of head of internal security at VK Tobacco and Sich Bank.

Prior to the 2022 Russian invasion of Ukraine, Kobets lived in Kyiv.

Sanctions 
In July 2022 the EU imposed sanctions on Oleksandr Kobets in relation to the 2022 Russian invasion of Ukraine.

Family 
Oleksandr Kobets's has a wife named Hanna Kobets and a daughter named Marianna Kramer (Kobets). His father is Yuriy Kobets.

Notes

References

External links 
 In Russian-occupied Ukraine, this is what democracy looks like

1959 births
Living people
Politicians from Kherson
Ukrainian businesspeople
Ukrainian collaborators with Russia during the 2022 Russian invasion of Ukraine
KGB officers
Security Service of Ukraine officers